The first competition weekend of the 2019–20 ISU Speed Skating World Cup was held at the Minsk Arena in Minsk, Belarus, from Friday, 15 November, until Sunday 17 November 2019.

Medal summary

Men's events

 In mass start, race points are accumulated during the race based on results of the intermediate sprints and the final sprint. The skater with most race points is the winner.

Women's events

 In mass start, race points are accumulated during the race based on results of the intermediate sprints and the final sprint. The skater with most race points is the winner.

References

1
ISU World Cup, 2019-20, 1
Sport in Minsk
2019 in Belarusian sport
ISU